The HBO television series The Larry Sanders Show, starring Garry Shandling, began on August 15, 1992, and aired its series finale on May 31, 1998. Six seasons were filmed, 90 episodes in total. The complete series is available on Region 1 DVD, released by Shout Factory, and seasons 1 and 2 are available on Region 2, released by Sony/Mediumrare. Various compilations are also available worldwide.

Shortly after Garry Shandling's death, HBO announced it had earlier completed a deal with Shandling to make the series available on their streaming services.

This list is ordered by the episodes' original air dates.

Series overview

Episodes

Season 1 (1992)

Season 2 (1993)

Season 3 (1994)

Season 4 (1995)

Season 5 (1996–97)

Season 6 (1998)

References

External links

 

Episodes
Larry Sanders Show episodes, List of The